The following is a list of current and former Super League venues.

Stadiums
A total of 36 home venues have been used by Super League clubs since the competition's inception in 1996, while clubs have also occasionally opted to play 'On the Road' matches away from their regular home venue.

Bold- current venues

On the Road matches

Magic Weekend
The Magic Weekend has been staged at four venues since the inaugural event in 2007.

Grand Final
The Super League Grand Final has been held at Old Trafford since its inauguration in 1998, except for the 2020 Super League Grand Final held at the KCOM Stadium.

See also

English rugby league venues
List of National Rugby League stadiums

Notes

External links
Super League I Venues @rugbyleagueproject.com
Super League II Venues @rugbyleagueproject.com
Super League III Venues @rugbyleagueproject.com
Super League IV Venues @rugbyleagueproject.com
Super League V Venues @rugbyleagueproject.com
Super League VI Venues @rugbyleagueproject.com
Super League VII Venues @rugbyleagueproject.com
Super League VIII Venues @rugbyleagueproject.com
Super League IX Venues @rugbyleagueproject.com
Super League X Venues @rugbyleagueproject.com
Super League XI Venues @rugbyleagueproject.com
Super League XII Venues @rugbyleagueproject.com
Super League XIII Venues @rugbyleagueproject.com
Super League XIV Venues @rugbyleagueproject.com
Super League XV @rugbyleagueproject.com
Super League XVI  @rugbyleagueproject.com
Super League XVII @rugbyleagueproject.com
Super League XVIII @rugbyleagueproject.com
Super League XIX @rugbyleagueproject.com
Super League XX @rugbyleagueproject.com
Super League XXI @rugbyleagueproject.com
Super League XXII @rugbyleagueproject.com
Super League XXIII @rugbyleagueproject.com
Super League XXIV @rugbyleagueproject.com

Venues
Rugby league-related lists
Lists of sports venues in the United Kingdom
Rugby league stadiums

fr:Super League (rugby)
it:Super League (rugby XIII)